The 2017–18 Saint Francis Red Flash men's basketball team represented Saint Francis University during the 2017–18 NCAA Division I men's basketball season. The Red Flash, led by sixth-year head coach Rob Krimmel, played their home games at the DeGol Arena in Loretto, Pennsylvania as members of the Northeast Conference. They finished the season 18–13, 12–6 in NEC play to finish in a tie for second place. They lost in the quarterfinals of the NEC tournament to Fairleigh Dickinson. They were invited to the CollegeInsider.com Tournament where they lost in the first round to UIC.

Previous season
The Red Flash finished the 2016–17 season at 17–17, 11–7 in NEC play to finish in a tie for third place. They defeated Bryant and Wagner to advance to the championship game of the NEC tournament where they lost to Mount St. Mary's. They were invited to the CollegeInsider.com Tournament where they defeated Jacksonville in the first round to win the Hugh Durham Classic. However, they lost in the second round of the CIT to UMBC.

Preseason
In a poll of league coaches at the NEC media day, the Red Flash were picked to win the NEC, receiving nine of 10 first place votes. Senior guard Isaiah Blackmon and sophomore Keith Braxton were named the preseason All-NEC team.

Roster

Schedule and results

|-
!colspan=9 style=| Non-conference regular season

   
|-
!colspan=9 style=| NEC regular season

 
|-
!colspan=9 style=| NEC tournament

|-
!colspan=9 style=| CIT

References

Saint Francis Red Flash men's basketball seasons
Saint Francis (PA)
Saint Francis
Saint Francis
Saint Francis (PA)